Earl marshal (alternatively marschal or marischal) is a hereditary royal officeholder and chivalric title under the sovereign of the United Kingdom used in England (then, following the Act of Union 1800, in the United Kingdom). He is the eighth of the great officers of State in the United Kingdom, ranking beneath the lord high constable and above the lord high admiral.  The dukes of Norfolk have held the office since 1672.

The marshal was originally responsible, along with the constable, for the monarch's horses and stables including connected military operations. As a result of the decline of chivalry and sociocultural change, the position of earl marshal has evolved and among his responsibilities today is the organisation of major ceremonial state occasions such as the monarch's coronation in Westminster Abbey and state funerals. He is also the leading officer of arms and oversees the College of Arms. He is the sole judge of the High Court of Chivalry.

The current earl marshal is Edward Fitzalan-Howard, 18th Duke of Norfolk, who inherited the position in June 2002. There was formerly an Earl Marshal of Ireland and earl marischal of Scotland.

History
The office of royal marshal existed in much of Europe, involving managing horses and protecting the monarch. In England, the office became hereditary under John FitzGilbert the Marshal (served c.1130–1165) after The Anarchy, and rose in prominence under his second son, William Marshal, later Earl of Pembroke. He served under several kings, acted as regent, and organised funerals and the regency during Henry III's childhood. After passing through his daughter's husband to the Earls of Norfolk, the post evolved into "Earl Marshal" and the title remained unchanged, even after the earldom of Norfolk became a dukedom.

In the Middle Ages, the Earl Marshal and the Lord High Constable were the officers of the king's horses and stables. When chivalry declined in importance, the constable's post declined and the Earl Marshal became the head of the College of Arms, the body concerned with all matters of genealogy and heraldry. In conjunction with the Lord High Constable, he had held a court, known as the Court of Chivalry, for the administration of justice in accordance with the law of arms, which was concerned with many subjects relating to military matters, such as ransom, booty and soldiers' wages, and including the misuse of armorial bearings.

In 1672, the office of Marshal of England and the title of Earl Marshal of England were made hereditary in the Howard family. In a declaration made on 16 June 1673 by Arthur Annesley, 1st Earl of Anglesey, the Lord Privy Seal, in reference to a dispute over the exercise of authority over the Officers of Arms the powers of the Earl Marshal were stated as being "to have power to order, judge, and determine all matters touching arms, ensigns of nobility, honour, and chivalry; to make laws, ordinances and statutes for the good government of the Officers of Arms; to nominate Officers to fill vacancies in the College of Arms; [and] to punish and correct Officers of Arms for misbehaviour in the execution of their places". Additionally it was declared that no patents of arms or any ensigns of nobility should be granted, and no augmentation, alteration, or addition should be made to arms, without the consent of the Earl Marshal.

The Earl Marshal is considered the eighth of the Great Officers of State, with the Lord High Constable above him and only the Lord High Admiral beneath him. Nowadays, the Earl Marshal's role has mainly to do with the organisation of major state ceremonies such as coronations and state funerals. Annually, the Earl Marshal helps organise the State Opening of Parliament. The Earl Marshal also remains to have charge over the College of Arms and no coat of arms may be granted without his warrant. As a symbol of his office, he carries a baton of gold with black finish at either end.

In the general order of precedence, the Earl Marshal is currently the highest hereditary position in the United Kingdom outside the Royal Family.  Although other state and ecclesiastical officers rank above in precedence, they are not hereditary. The exception is the office of Lord Great Chamberlain, which is notionally higher than Earl Marshal and also hereditary.  The holding of the Earl Marshalship secures the Duke of Norfolk's traditional position as the "first peer" of the land, above all other dukes.

The House of Lords Act 1999 removed the automatic right of hereditary peers to sit in the House of Lords, but the Act provided that the persons holding the office of Earl Marshal and, if a peer, the Lord Great Chamberlain continue for the time being to have seats so as to carry out their ceremonial functions in the House of Lords.

Lords Marshal of England, 1135–1386

 Gilbert Marshal ?–1129 (?)
 John Marshal 1130–1165 (?)
 John Marshal 1165–1194
 William Marshal, 1st Earl of Pembroke 1194–1219
 William Marshal, 2nd Earl of Pembroke 1219–1231
 Richard Marshal, 3rd Earl of Pembroke 1231–1234
 Gilbert Marshal, 4th Earl of Pembroke 1234–1241
 Walter Marshal, 5th Earl of Pembroke 1242–1245
 Anselm Marshal, 6th Earl of Pembroke 1245
 Roger Bigod, 4th Earl of Norfolk 1245–1269
 Roger Bigod, 5th Earl of Norfolk 1269–1306
 Robert de Clifford 1307–1308
 Nicholas Seagrave 1308–1316
 Thomas of Brotherton, 1st Earl of Norfolk 1316–1338
 William Montagu, 1st Earl of Salisbury 1338-1344
 Margaret, Duchess of Norfolk 1338–1377
 Henry Percy, Lord Percy 1377
 John FitzAlan, 1st Baron Arundel, Lord Maltravers 1377–1383 (died 1379)
 Thomas Mowbray, 1st Earl of Nottingham 1385–1386

Earls Marshal of England, 1386–present

Deputy Earls Marshal of England
The position of Earl Marshal had a Deputy called the Knight Marshal from the reign of Henry VIII until the office was abolished in 1846.

Deputy Earls Marshal have been named at various times, discharging the responsibilities of the office during the minority or infirmity of the Earl Marshal. Prior to an Act of Parliament in 1824, Protestant deputies were required when the Earl Marshal was a Roman Catholic, which occurred frequently due to the Catholicism of the Norfolks.

See also
 Lord Lyon King of Arms
 Earl Marischal of Scotland
 Earl Marshal of Ireland

Notes

References
 
 Sliford, William (1782). The Court Register and Statesman's Remembrancer
 Round, J.H. (1899) The Commune of London, and other Studies. Westminster: Constable.
 Debretts.com
 Tudorplace.com
 The dormant and extinct baronage of England - Banks - PP356ff

Ceremonial officers in the United Kingdom
College of Arms
Constitution of the United Kingdom
Politics of England
Heraldry and law
Male Shakespearean characters